|}

This is a list of results for the Legislative Council at the 2014 South Australian state election.

Election results

See also
 Candidates of the 2014 South Australian state election
 Members of the South Australian Legislative Council, 2014–2018

References

2014
2014 elections in Australia
2010s in South Australia